The women's 100 metre freestyle event at the 1948 Olympic Games took place between 30 July and 2 August at the Empire Pool. This swimming event used freestyle swimming, which means that the method of the stroke is not regulated (unlike backstroke, breaststroke, and butterfly events). Nearly all swimmers use the front crawl or a variant of that stroke. Because an Olympic size swimming pool is 50 metres long, this race consisted of two lengths of the pool.

Results

Heats

Semifinals

Final

References

Women's freestyle 100 metre
1948 in women's swimming
Women's events at the 1948 Summer Olympics